1988 in professional wrestling describes the year's events in the world of professional wrestling.

List of notable promotions 
These promotions held notable shows in 1988.

Calendar of notable shows

Notable events
 January 24 - WWE Royal Rumble was aired on USA Network against the NWA  Bunkhouse Stampede that aired live on Pay Per View.
 March 27 - Clash of the Champions I was aired on free TV via TBS against the WWE pay-per view event WrestleMania IV.
 April 3 - WCW Main Event Premired on TBS.
 July 16 - Bruiser Brody was stabbed by Jose Huertas Gonzalez before a WWC live event in Bayamon, Puerto Rico. Brody died hours later in a local hospital.
 November 1 - Turner Broadcasting Systems purchased Jim Crockett Promotions the biggest National Wrestling Alliance territory.
 November - Jerry Jarrett buys 50 percent of WCWA from Ken Mantell
 December 13 - AWA World Heavyweight Champion Jerry Lawler defeated WCWA World Heavyweight Champion Kerry Von Erich in Chicago, Illinois at AWA Superclash III to unify both the AWA and WCWA World titles.

Tournaments and accomplishments

JCP

WWF

Awards and honors

Pro Wrestling Illustrated

Wrestling Observer Newsletter

Title changes

WWF

Births
January 16 - Bull Dempsey
January 19 - Tyler Breeze
February 26 - Reid Flair (d. 2013)
March 11 - Katsuhiko Nakajima
March 16 - Brett DiBiase
March 20 - Jonathan Gresham 
April 17 - Dasha Fuentes
May 5 - Brooke Hogan
May 6 - Dakota Kai
May 22 - Santana Garrett 
May 26 - Babatunde Aiyegbusi
May 30 - No Way Jose
June 1 - Ross Von Erich 
June 2 - Grado 
June 19 - Daga
June 25 - Mark Haskins
July 6 - Lars Sullivan
July 26 - Marty Scurll 
August 7 - Marti Belle
August 8 - Veer Mahaan 
August 12 - Tyson Fury
August 31 - Ember Moon
September 13 - Markus Crane (died in 2021) 
September 23 - Kairi Hojo
September 26 - Buddy Murphy
September 27 - Cathy Kelley
 September 28 – Jason Jordan
 October 11 - Ricochet
 November 2 - Dezmond Xavier 
 November 3 - Gran Metalik
November 29 - Dana Brooke

Debuts
Uncertain debut date
Gangrel
Sandra Margot
Perry Saturn
February 20 - Raven
September 13 - Dustin Runnels

Retirements
 Alexis Smirnoff (1970 - 1988)
 Rufus R. Jones (1969 - 1988)
 The Crusher (1949 - 1988)
 Emile Dupree (1955 - 1988)
 Mr. Hito (June 8, 1967 - March 25, 1988)
 Shunji Kosugi (1981-April 10, 1988, returned for one last match in 2010) 
 Winona Littleheart (1977 - 1988)
 Jody Hamilton (1955 - 1988)
 John Quinn (1961 - 1988)
 Outback Jack (1986 - 1988)
 Scott McGhee (1978 - January 1988)
 Buddy Roberts (1965 - 1988)

Deaths
March 14 - Saul Weingeroff, 72
March 30 - Stu Gibson, 62
April 30 - Man Mountain Mike, 47 
April 30 - Tiger Joe Tomasso, 65/66
May 15 - Fred Atkins, 77/78 
June 15 - Mike Clancy, 63
July 4 - Adrian Adonis, 33
July 4 - Dave McKigney, 56
July 17 - Bruiser Brody, 42
September 6 - Leroy Brown, 37
September 9 - Leroy McGuirk, 77
November 26 - Baron Michele Leone, 79
November 30 - Ricky Lawless, 28
December 21 - Dave Ruhl, 68

See also
List of WCW pay-per-view events
List of WWF pay-per-view events

References

 
professional wrestling